Squadra antimafia, internationally released as Little Italy, is a 1978 Italian "poliziottesco"-comedy film directed by Bruno Corbucci. It is the fourth chapter in the Nico Giraldi film series starred by Tomas Milian.

Cast 
 Tomas Milian as Nico Giraldi
 Enzo Cannavale as Salvatore Esposito
 Eli Wallach as Don Girolamo Giarra
 Bombolo as Venticello
 Margherita Fumero as Maria Sole Giarra
 Massimo Vanni as Brigadiere Gargiulo
 John P. Dulaney as Ballarin
 Tomas Milian, Jr. as Francesco

See also 
 List of Italian films of 1978

References

External links

1978 films
Films directed by Bruno Corbucci
Italian crime comedy films
Poliziotteschi films
Films set in Rome
Films set in the United States
Films scored by Goblin (band)
1970s crime comedy films
1970s Italian-language films
1970s Italian films